Mandideep railway station is a small railway station in Raisen district, Madhya Pradesh. Its code is MDDP. It serves Mandideep city. The station consists of two platforms. The platforms are well sheltered. It has well many facilities including water, WiFi and sanitation. It has two foot overbridges.

Major trains

 Narmada Express
 Panchvalley Fast Passenger
 Itarsi–Jhansi Passenger
 Mumbai CST–Amritsar Express
 Kushinagar Express

References

Railway stations in Raisen district
Bhopal railway division